The Volkswagen Polo GTI R5 is a rally car built by Volkswagen Motorsport and based upon the Volkswagen Polo road car. It is built to R5 regulations and is a successor to the Volkswagen Polo R WRC. The Polo GTI R5 made its competitive début at the 2018 Rally Catalunya, where it was driven by 2003 World Drivers' Champion Petter Solberg and Eric Camilli. The car currently competes in the World Rally Championship-2 where it is entered by various privateers.

History

After four years of extremely dominant success in the outright category of the WRC with the Volkswagen Polo R WRC, in 2016 Volkswagen Motorsport began development of a new Polo WRC for the 2017-specification regulations. Despite extensive testing undertaken with the car, in November 2016 Volkswagen announced they would cancel development of the new Polo, along with a withdrawal from the World Rally Championship. In April of 2017, however, Volkswagen announced intentions to remain in the sport, with plans to develop the new Volkswagen Polo GTI for the R5 class, to be used mostly in the hands of privateer drivers in the World Rally Championship-2.

The R5 Polo was developed in collaboration with Skoda, one of Volkswagen's subsidiaries, who also had an R5 car of their own, based on the Skoda Fabia. In December of 2017, Volkswagen officially unveiled the R5-specification Volkswagen Polo GTI. The car's engine developed 272 brake horsepower from 1.6 litres. Volkswagen's plans were to have the first completed model passing international homologation by the summer of 2018, and begin delivery to customers soon afterwards.

Shortly afterwards, Volkswagen confirmed fifteen cars had been ordered by various European and South American customers. Austrian rally team BRR Baumschlager Rallye & Racing had purchased three of them, with other cars going to other high-end teams such as Printsport and Kristoffersson Motorsport.

Results

World Rally Championship-2 victories

World Rally Championship-3 victories

European Rally Championship victories

References

See also
 Volkswagen Polo R WRC
 Group R
 Citroën C3 R5
 Ford Fiesta R5
 Hyundai i20 R5
 Škoda Fabia R5

R5 cars
Polo GTI R5
All-wheel-drive vehicles